Art Hughes is a retired American professional soccer defender who played in the 1980s in the original Major Indoor Soccer League, the American Indoor Soccer Association, and the SISL currently the United Soccer League.

Hughes attended Memphis Central, playing on the men's soccer team from 1979 to 1982. In 1981 Hughes was selected to the Tennessee All-State team, and would turn professional in the fall of 1982 with the Memphis Americans of the Major Indoor Soccer League.

At the end of the 1984 season he signed with the Louisville Thunder of the AISA playing three seasons and helping the team win the league championship in 1986-87. 
The 1987-88 season found Hughes returning to Memphis playing with the Memphis Storm also of the AISA for three seasons until the end of the 1989-90 season.

For the 1989-90 season the Memphis Storm was sold and the new owners changed the team name to the Memphis Rogues which was the name of the cities North American Soccer League team from the late 1970s. The team switched leagues and joined the Sunbelt Independent Soccer League for the 1990-91 season.

Hughes played with the team until an auto accident ended his career in 1991.

During his career Hughes was coached and mentored by some true legends of soccer including 1974 German World Cup champion Bernd Holzenbein, US National Soccer Hall of Famer Kyle Rote Jr, and current USA National Team Futsal coach Keith Tozer are some notables.

Beyond his 1987 AISA Championship and 4 time All-Star team picks in both the MISL and AISA Hughes is probably most remembered for what he did in 1989 off the soccer pitch. In December 1988 while playing with the Memphis Storm of the American Indoor Soccer Association word came of a huge cyclone that had just devastated Bangladesh. Having recently lost a childhood school mate Hughes decided to donated his entire seasons salary to help rebuild a school in the West Bengal Narayanganjri region most ravaged by the storm.

Yearly awards
 MISL All-Star Team - 1984
 AISA All-Star Team - 1985, 1986, 1988

References

External links
 MISL stats
 AISA stats
 Memphis Americans

1965 births
American soccer players
Memphis Americans players
Living people
Major Indoor Soccer League (1978–1992) players
Louisville Thunder players
Memphis Storm players
American Indoor Soccer Association players
Association football defenders
Soccer players from Memphis, Tennessee